Harry Schuldham Howard (1 September 1873 – 25 October 1945) was an Australian rules footballer who played with Carlton in the Victorian Football League (VFL).

Notes

External links 

Harry Howard's profile at Blueseum

1873 births
Australian rules footballers from Victoria (Australia)
Carlton Football Club (VFA) players
Carlton Football Club players
1945 deaths